Mihály Flaskay (born May 18, 1982 in Debrecen) is a breaststroke swimmer from Hungary, who was a silver medallist in the 50 m breaststroke (27.51) at the 2002 European Swimming Championships. In the following year he captured bronze in the same event at the 2003 World Aquatics Championships in Barcelona, Spain. 
 
Flaskay studied at the University of Southern California.

References

1982 births
Living people
Hungarian male swimmers
Male breaststroke swimmers
World Aquatics Championships medalists in swimming
European Aquatics Championships medalists in swimming
Universiade medalists in swimming
USC Trojans men's swimmers
Universiade bronze medalists for Hungary
Medalists at the 2003 Summer Universiade
Sportspeople from Debrecen